Nemocnice Motol is a Prague Metro station on Line A. The station was opened on 6 April 2015 as part of the extension from Dejvická and is the western terminus of this line. The station is located in Prague 5 and is named after the nearby Motol University Hospital.

General information
The station's original planned name was simply Motol after the area of the same name. Nevertheless, the name was finally changed to better reflect the actual location of the station next to the Motol Hospital, the largest medical facility in the Czech Republic.

The station was built as a surface station and was designed by the architect Pavel Sýs.

Gallery

References

Prague Metro stations
Railway stations opened in 2015
2015 establishments in the Czech Republic
Railway stations in the Czech Republic opened in the 21st century